Meya may refer to:

 Anderson Sunda-Meya, Congolese–American physicist
 Avice Meya (born 1994), Ugandan swimmer
 Luis Meya (born 1951), Spanish water polo player
 Meya Banda (born 1991), Zambian football player
 Nicolas Bayona Ba Meya (1938–1998), Congolese jurist